Arshak Gavafian, better known by his nom de guerre Keri (1858 – 15 May 1916), was an Armenian fedayee military commander and member of the Armenian Revolutionary Federation.

Biography
Arshak Gavafian was born in Erzurum. He graduated from the local Armenian school. Gavafian had soon taken part in Armenian resistance activity. In 1895, during the Hamidian massacres in Erzurum, Gavafian led an armed group to protect Armenian people in the region and soon became their spiritual leader.

Gavafian moved to Sasun in 1903 and took part in the 1904 Sasun uprising. After moving to Vaspurakan, he was one of the organizers of the Armenian self-defense of Zangezur (in particular, Angeghakot) during the Armenian–Tatar massacres. In the following years he took part in the Persian Constitutional Revolution from 1908 to 1912 and was an associate of Yeprem Khan. After Yeprem's death, Gavafian had his killers liquidated in revenge and took the leadership of the Caucasian troops.

After the declaration of the First World War, Keri became the commander of the 4th Armenian volunteer battalion of the Imperial Russian Army in 1914. Keri led the volunteer unit in the Battle of Sarikamish at the Barduz pass. Victory was largely determined by the courage of the Armenian soldiers and military genius of Keri, who relieved the besieged Russian and Armenian troops at Rowanduz in 1916.

In 1916, on his way to Mosul from Rowanduz, Keri and his detachment were surrounded and, while trying to get out, he was killed in battle. After his death, his body was transferred to Tiflis and buried within the Armenian Khojivank cemetery.

See also
Battle of Sarikamish
Armenian Fedayi
Battle of Koprukoy

References

1858 births
1916 deaths
People from Erzurum
Armenian fedayi
Armenian generals
Armenian nationalists
Armenian people of World War I
Imperial Russian Army personnel
Russian military personnel of World War I
People of the Persian Constitutional Revolution
Guerrillas killed in action
Armenians from the Ottoman Empire
Burials at Armenian Pantheon of Tbilisi